Janine Kunze (born 20 March 1974 in Cologne) is a German actress and television presenter. She is best known for her roles in the comedy series Hausmeister Krause – Ordnung muss sein and sketch comedy show Die Dreisten Drei, in which she participated from 2007 to 2008, replacing Mirja Boes.

Kunze also appeared in Die Rote Meile, Balko, Barfuss, The Comedy Trap, Clueless Genius: The Comedy Arena, and Extreme Activity, among others. In 2011, she presented the second season of Die Alm, along with Daniel Aminati.

Personal life
Kunze is married with Dirk Budach. She has two daughters and one son.

References

External links
 

1974 births
Living people
Television people from Cologne
German television actresses
German television presenters
German women television presenters